Paulo Roberto Rink (born 21 February 1973) is a former footballer who played as a forward. Most commonly known for his time at Bayer Leverkusen, the Brazilian-born player earned 13 caps representing Germany. He retired in 2007.

Club career
Born in Curitiba, Rink began his career playing for Athlético Paranaense. After a solid career with the club, he negotiated with Bayer Leverkusen, and was transferred for US$6 million, the highest transfer fee paid for an Atlético Paranaense player at that time. Rink remained there for four years, barring a six-month break, when he was loaned out to Santos FC.

He played for several other clubs, 1. FC Nürnberg, FC Energie Cottbus, Vitesse Arnhem, Jeonbuk Hyundai Motors, Olympiakos Nicosia and Omonia Nicosia.

Rink ended his career in Athlético Paranaense, where his career started. His honorary match took place on 24 May 2007 at the Kyocera Arena. Playing in Paulo Rink's friends team were amongst others: Oséas, his old friend, who from 1995 to 1998 acted as his striking partner at Atlético Paranaense. Also present was the Uruguayan Gustavo Matosas, teammate in 1997 and 1998 and Kléberson, who played with him in 1998.

International career
Rink, whose great-grandfather had emigrated from Heidelberg to Brazil in 1904, was naturalized as a German citizen and subsequently called up to the Germany national team by then manager Berti Vogts in September 1998. He was the first Brazilian to play for Germany. The attacker took part in friendlies against Romania and Malta. A year afterwards, while still playing for Bayer Leverkusen, he was once again called up, this time for the 1999 Confederations Cup in Mexico. He played for Germany in the 2000 UEFA European Championship as well. In total, Rink was able to collect 13 international caps between 1998 and 2000.

References

External links 
 
 
 
 
 Leverkusen who's who
 CBF 
 Atlético Paranaense who's who 
 

1973 births
Living people
Footballers from Curitiba
Brazilian people of German descent
Citizens of Germany through descent
German footballers
Germany international footballers
Bayer 04 Leverkusen players
1999 FIFA Confederations Cup players
German expatriate footballers
Santos FC players
UEFA Euro 2000 players
1. FC Nürnberg players
German expatriate sportspeople in South Korea
FC Energie Cottbus players
Expatriate footballers in Cyprus
Olympiakos Nicosia players
German expatriate sportspeople in the Netherlands
German people of Brazilian descent
Expatriate footballers in the Netherlands
Eredivisie players
SBV Vitesse players
Expatriate footballers in South Korea
K League 1 players
Jeonbuk Hyundai Motors players
AC Omonia players
Association football forwards
Clube Atlético Mineiro players
Club Athletico Paranaense players
Associação Chapecoense de Futebol players
Brazilian expatriate sportspeople in South Korea
Campeonato Brasileiro Série A players
Bundesliga players
Cypriot First Division players